The Shakespearian-class trawler was a series of anti-submarine naval trawlers of the Royal Navy. The trawlers were armed with a QF 12-pounder [] gun, three 20 mm Oerlikon anti-aircraft guns and thirty depth charges. The class was nearly identical to the s, of which they are usually considered a subclass. Coriolanus, Horatio and Laertes were lost during the war. Othello, was transferred to Italy in 1946 and Rosalind to Kenya, also in 1946. By the end of that year, only Hamlet and Macbeth remained in service with the Royal Navy; both were sold in 1947.

Ships in class
 Built by Cochrane & Sons, Selby, UK
  – Launched 1940, sold 1946
  – Launched 1940, war loss 1945
  – Launched 1940, sold 1946
 Built by Cook, Welton & Gemmell, Beverley, UK
  – Launched 24 July 1940, sold 1947
  – Launched 1940, war loss 1943
  – Launched 1940, sold 1946 
  – Launched 1940, war loss 1942
 Built by Goole Shipbuilding & Repair Co., Goole, UK
  – Launched 3 October 1940, sold 1947
  – Launched 1940, sold 1946
 Built by Hall, Russell & Company, Ltd., Aberdeen, UK
  – Launched 1941, transferred to Italy 1946 as DR 310
 Built by A. & J. Inglis, Ltd., Glasgow, UK
  – Launched 1941, sold 1946
  – Launched 3 May 1941, transferred to Kenya 1946, joined Royal East African Navy 1952, redeployed to Madagascar 1964

See also
 Operation Dervish
 Trawlers of the Royal Navy

References
 Robert Gardiner (ed. dir.), Conway's All the World's Fighting Ships 1922–1946, p. 66. London: Conway Maritime Press, 1980.
 Francis E. McMurtrie and Raymond V.B. Blackman (eds.), Jane's Fighting Ships 1949–50, pp. 102, 217. New York: The McGraw-Hill Book Company, Inc., 1949.
 Anthony Preston (ed.), Jane's Fighting Ships of World War II, p. 77. New York: Military Press, 1989. This is mainly a reprint of Jane's Fighting Ships 1946–47 with some materials from earlier editions.

External links
 Shakespearian class ships at uboat.net
 Naval trawlers at battleships-cruisers.co.uk

Gunboat classes
Mine warfare vessel classes
 
Ship classes of the Royal Navy